Below are listed all the matches played by the Costa Rica national football team between 2000 and 2009.

Results

2000

2001

2002

2003

2004

2005

2006

Costa Rica played the non-FIFA Catalonia team on 24 May 2006; this did not contribute to ranking points or individual cap totals.

2007

2008

2009

See also
Costa Rica at the Copa América

References

Costa Rica national football team results